Andrea O'Reilly Ph.D. (born 1961) is a writer on women's issues and currently a Professor in the School of Women's Studies at York University in Toronto, Ontario, Canada.

Career
O'Reilly founded the Association for Research on Mothering (ARM) at York University in 1998 and ran it until it closed in 2010. Its disbandment led to the inception of a new organization, the Motherhood Initiative for Research and Community Involvement (MIRCI). She is founder and editor-in-chief of the Journal of the Association for Research on Mothering, now the Journal of the Motherhood Initiative for Research and Community Involvement. In 2006, as director of ARM, she founded Demeter Press, the first feminist press on motherhood. As well, she is founder of the feminist mothers group "Mother Outlaws". 

She is also the author and editor of eighteen books on motherhood.

Selected works
 Redefining Motherhood: Changing Identities and Patterns. (Second Story Press, 1998)
 Toni Morrison and Motherhood: A Politics of the Heart. (SUNY Press, 2004)
 From Motherhood to Mothering: The Legacy of Adrienne Rich's Of Woman Born. (SUNY Press, 2004)
 Motherhood: Power and Oppression (edited by Marie Porter, Patricia Short & Andrea O'Reilly). (Women's Press, 2005)
 Rocking the Cradle: Thoughts on Feminism, Motherhood and the Possibility of Empowered Mothering. (Demeter Press, 2006)
 Encyclopedia of Motherhood, General Editor. (Sage, 2010)

See also
Adrienne Rich
Women's studies
Feminism
Mothering

References

External links
 York University Profile
 Demeter Press

1961 births
Living people
Canadian people of Irish descent
Canadian non-fiction writers
Canadian feminists
Feminist studies scholars
Academic staff of York University
Canadian women non-fiction writers